Daniyal was a Palestinian Arab village in the Ramle Subdistrict.

Daniyal may also refer to:

 Daniyal Akhmetov (born 1954), Russian politician
 Daniyal Ametov, Crimean Tatar land-squatting activist in the Ukraine
 Daniyal Biy (1720–1785), Uzbek ruler of the Khanate of Bukhara
 Daniyal Mirza (1572–1602), Mughal prince, son of Mughal emperor Akbar
 Daniyal Mueenuddin (born 1963), Pakistani author
 Daniyal Raheal (born 1983), Pakistani actor
 Daniyal Robinson, American collegiate basketball coach
 Dhanial, a tribe in Pakistan
 Daniel in Islam